Gaston Émile Marius Jacquet (14 August 1883 – 28 January 1970) was a French actor.

Jacquet was born in Lanas, Ardèche, France and died in 1970 in Thonex in Switzerland.

Selected filmography
 Les Trois Mousquetaires (1921)
 The Hurricane on the Mountain (1922)
 The Orchid Dancer (1928)
 Nile Water (1928)
 Suzy Saxophone (1928)
 The Maelstrom of Paris (1928)
 Their Son (1929)
 House in the Sun (1929)
 Sin of a Beautiful Woman (1929)
 Latin Quarter (1929)
 The Girl with the Whip (1929)
 When the White Lilacs Bloom Again (1929)
 The Road to Paradise (1930)
 Hai-Tang (1930)
 Illusions (1930)
 There Is a Woman Who Never Forgets You (1930)
 Miss Europe (1930)
 David Golder (1931)
 The Indictment (1931)
 Abduct Me (1932)
 A Man's Neck (1933)
 Charlemagne (1933)
 Le Golem (1936)
 Girls in Distress (1939)
 The Emigrant (1940)
 The House of Lovers (1957)

Bibliography
 Powrie, Phil & Rebillard, Éric. Pierre Batcheff and stardom in 1920s French cinema. Edinburgh University Press, 2009

References

External links

1883 births
1970 deaths
French male film actors
French male silent film actors
People from Ardèche
20th-century French male actors